Alf Brandt (born 25 July 1958) is a Swedish racewalker. He competed in the men's 20 kilometres walk at the 1980 Summer Olympics.

References

1958 births
Living people
Athletes (track and field) at the 1980 Summer Olympics
Swedish male racewalkers
Olympic athletes of Sweden
Place of birth missing (living people)